The 1963–64 Divizia B was the 24th season of the second tier of the Romanian football league system.

The format has been changed to two series, each of them having 14 teams. At the end of the season the winners of the series promoted to Divizia A and the last two places from each series relegated to Divizia C.

Team changes

To Divizia B
Promoted from Regional Championship
 —

Relegated from Divizia A
 Dinamo Bacău
 Minerul Lupeni

From Divizia B
Relegated to Divizia C
 Dinamo Obor București
 Recolta Carei
 Progresul Alexandria
 Vagonul Arad
 Rapid Focșani
 CFR Roșiori
 Steaua Dej
 Flamura Roșie Tecuci
 Metalul Turnu Severin
 CFR-IRTA Arad

Promoted to Divizia A
 Siderurgistul Galați
 Dinamo Pitești
 ASA Crișul Oradea

Excluded teams 
Crișana Oradea relegated at the end of the 1962–63 Divizia A season, but was dissolved during the summer break and excluded from the new season of Divizia B.

Other relegated teams 
Carpați Sinaia, Prahova Ploiești, Progresul Brăila and IMU Medgidia were relegated directly to Local Championship due to a match fixing scandal and also for repeated violence events recorded on their stadiums.

League tables

Serie I

Serie II

See also 

 1963–64 Divizia A
 1963–64 Divizia C

References

Liga II seasons
Romania
2